Daniel Lee Nickrent is an American botanist, working in plant evolutionary biology, including the subdisciplines of genomics, phylogenetics, systematics, population genetics, and taxonomy.  A major focus has been parasitic flowering plants, particularly of the sandalwood order (Santalales). His interest in photographic documentation and photographic databases has led to several photographic databases including Parasitic Plant Connection, Phytoimages, Plant Checklist for the Rocky Mountain National Park, and Plant Checklist for the Crab Orchard National Wildlife Refuge.

Nickrent has over 9400 citations (as of 15 October 2019) according to Google Scholar. He is Research Faculty and Professor Emeritus of Plant Molecular Systematics and Evolution at Southern Illinois University Carbondale (SIUC).

Education 
After completing one year towards his undergraduate degree at Illinois State University, Nickrent's interest in plants began during his participation in an NSF-sponsored research project where he worked on the flora of the Great Dismal Swamp under the direction of Lytton Musselman at Old Dominion University. This work resulted in his first publication. In 1977 he received a bachelor's degree in Botany from Southern Illinois University. He earned a master's degree from Old Dominion University with work on the parasite witchweed Striga, and earned a PhD from Miami University in 1984 ("A systematic and evolutionary study of selected taxa in the genus Arceuthobium (Viscaceae)").

Career 
From 1984 to 1990, Nickrent was assistant professor and Director of the University of Illinois Herbarium (ILL) at the University of Illinois at Urbana–Champaign.

From 1990 to 1994, Nickrent was assistant professor in the faculty of Plant Biology, Southern Illinois University Carbondale. During this period, his laboratory methodology changed from working with rRNA to DNA using the polymerase chain reaction (PCR) which made sequencing genes easier. This resulted in the discovery of increased rates of gene evolution in parasitic plants and the publication of one of the earliest species-level molecular phylogenies using nuclear ITS on the dwarf mistletoes, Arceuthobium.

From 1994 to 2003, as an associate professor in the Department of Plant Biology, Southern Illinois University Carbondale, Nickrent's research program expanded to examine many groups of parasitic plants, including those that lack photosynthesis (holoparasites). In 2004, he again collaborated with Musselman to produce an article on parasitic plants hosted by the American Phytopathological Society.

From 2003 to 2014, Nickrent was a full professor at the university, becoming an emeritus professor (SIUC) from 2014 onwards. His work on Rafflesia in the Philippines was supported by a grant from the National Geographic Society in 2008, the start of a continuing collaboration with Julie Barcelona and Pieter Pelser. His work in the Philippines, funded by NSF-DEB in 2018, is a collaborative project with Botanical Research Institute of Texas and other national and international institutions. Other grants have also been awarded to Nickrent as principal investigator to allow continuing work on other aspects of Santalales and parasitic plants.

The Angiosperm Phylogeny Website (Santalales) notes that in 2008, Der & Nickrent found Santalaceae to be polyphyletic with some genera being outside the family, but eight well supported clades within. While in 2019, Nickrent and others further improved resolution within the family, using nuclear and chloroplast genes, while trying to understand its complex morphology.

Since 1986, Nickrent has served as an associate professional scientist with the Illinois Natural History Survey.

Honors

Eponymous species 
 Amyema nickrentii Barcelona & Pelser – 2013, Phytotaxa 125(1) 47.
 Phoradendron nickrentianum Kuijt – 2011, Novon 21(4) 456.

Taxa named
Nickrent has authored some 47 taxa, including:
Thesium nautimontanum M.A.García, Nickrent & Mucina, PhytoKeys 109: 44 (2018).
Lepeostegeres cebuensis Barcelona, Nickrent & Pelser, Phytotaxa 266(1): 48 (2016).
Lacomucinaea lineata (L.f.) Nickrent & M.A.García, Phytotaxa 224(2): 180 (2015).
Arceuthobium littorum Hawksw., Wiens & Nickrent, Novon 2: 206 (1992).
Rafflesia verrucosa Balete, Pelser, Nickrent & Barcelona, Phytotaxa 10: 50 (49–55; figs. 2A-F, 3A-F) (2010).
Staufferia Z.S.Rogers, Nickrent & Malécot, Ann. Missouri Bot. Gard. 95(2): 394–395) (2008).
Pilgerina Z.S.Rogers, Nickrent & Malécot, Ann. Missouri Bot. Gard. 95(2): 398–399) (2008).
Cervantesiaceae Nickrent & Der, Taxon 59(2): 551 (2010).
Nanodeaceae Nickrent & Der, Taxon 59(2): 552 (2010).

Selected publications
 
 .
 Amico G.C., Nickrent, D.L. & Vidal-Russell, R.. 2018. "Macroscale analysis of mistletoe host ranges in the Andean-Patagonian forest". Plant Biology pdf. .
 
 
 
 
Pyšek, P., Pergl, J., Essl, F., Lenzner, B., Dawson, W., Kreft, H., Weigelt, P., Winter, M., Kartesz, J., Nishino, M., Antonova, L. A., Baptiste, M. P., Barcelona, J. F., Cabezas, F. J., Cárdenas, D., Cárdenas-Toro, J., Castaño, N., Chacón, E., Chatelain, C., Dullinger, S., Ebel, A. L., Figueiredo, E., Fuentes, N., Genovesi, P., Groom, Q. J., Henderson, L., Inderjit, Kupriyanov, A., Masciadri, S., Maurel, N., Meerman, J., Morozova, O., Moser, D., Nickrent, D., Nowak, P. M., Pagad, S., Patzelt, A., Pelser, P. B., Seebens, H., Shu, W.-S., Thomas, J., Velayos, M., Weber, E., Wieringa, J. J., Kleunen, M. v. 2017. Naturalized and invasive alien flora of the world: species diversity, taxonomic and phylogenetic patterns, geographic distribution and global hotspots of plant invasion. Preslia 89: 203–274.
Nickrent, D. L. & L. J. Musselman. (2017) Parasitic plants. Chapter 17, pp. 277–288 in Plant Pathology: Concepts and Laboratory Exercises, 3rd. Ed., Ownley, B. H. and R. N. Trigiano (eds.). CRC Press, Boca Raton.
Nickrent, D. L. 2016. Ximeniaceae, Schoepfiaceae, Comandraceae, Thesiaceae, Cervantesiaceae, Santalaceae, Viscaceae.  Pp. 404–440 in: Flora North America, Volume 12, Flora North America Editorial Committee (eds.), Oxford University Press, New York. Flora of North America online: Volume 12
Pelser, P. B., D. L. Nickrent, & J. F. Barcelona. 2016. Untangling a vine and its parasite: Host specificity of Philippine Rafflesia (Rafflesiaceae). Taxon 65(4):739–758.  For Supplemental data.
Pelser, P.B., D. L. Nickrent, A. R. T. Reintar, & J. F. Barcelona. (2016) Lepeostegeres cebuensis (Loranthaceae), a new mistletoe species from Cebu, Philippines. Phytotaxa 266(1):48–52.
Pearse, I. S., G. Spyreas, D. Nickrent, P. Anders, A. Epstein, & M. Greenwood. (2015) Illinois Plants (www.inhs.illinois.edu/data/plantdb) is here: A new online resource for botanists and plant enthusiasts in Illinois. Natural History Survey Reports No. 413 (10): 19–20.3.

Kleunen, M.v., Dawson, W., Essl, F., Pergl, J., Winter, M., Weber, E., Kreft, H., Weigelt, P., Kartesz, J., Nishino, M., Antonov, L., Barcelona, J., Cabezas, F., Cardenas, D., Cardenas-Toro, J., Castaño, N., Chacón, E., Chatelain, C., Ebel, A., Figueiredo, E., Fuentes, N., Groom, Q., Henderson, L., Inderjit, Kupriyanov, A., Masciadri, S., Meerman, J., Morozova, O., Moser, D., Nickrent, D., Patzelt, A., Pelser, P., Baptiste, M., Poopath, M., Schulze, M., Seebens, H., Shu, W.-S., Thomas, J., Velayos, M., Wieringa, J., & Pyšek, P. 2015. Global exchange and accumulation of non-native plants. Nature 525:100–104.

 pdf
 Sipes S. D., K. E. Huff Hartz, H. Amin, A. Anterola, and D. L. Nickrent. 2014. Floral scent and pollinators of the holoparasite Pilostyles thurberi (Apodanthaceae). Journal of Pollination Ecology 12: 31–39.

Barcelona J. F., D. L. Nickrent, J. V. LaFrankie, J. R. C. Callado and P. B. Pelser. 2013. Co's digital flora of the Philippines: plant identification and conservation through cybertaxonomy. Philippine Journal of Science 142: 57–67.

 Nickrent, D.L. 2012. Justification for subspecies in Arceuthobium campylopodum (Viscaceae). Phytoneuron 51: 1–11.

Judd, W.S., Nickrent, D.L., Robertson, K.R., Abbott, J.R., Carlsward, B.S., Schuster, T.M., Campbell, C.S., Neubig, K.M., Zona, S., Donoghue, M.J. & Kellogg, E.A. (2011) Photo Gallery of Vascular Plants Sinauer Associates 
 Barcelona, J.F., E.S. Fernando, D.L. Nickrent, D.S. Balete, and P.B. Pelser. 2011. An amended description of Rafflesia leonardi and a revised key to Philippine Rafflesia (Rafflesiaceae). Phytotaxa 24: 11–18.
 Nickrent, D. L. 2011. (Including Mistletoes). Encyclopedia of Life Science. John Wiley & Sons, Ltd.: Chichester 
Balete D. S., P. B. Pelser, D. L. Nickrent, and J. F. Barcelona. 2010. "Rafflesia verrucosa (Rafflesiaceae), a new species of small-flowered Rafflesia from Mindanao, Philippines." Phytotaxa 10: 49–57.
Ulloa, C.U., D.L. Nickrent, C. Whitefoord, and D.L. Kelly. 2010. Hondurodendron, a new monotypic genus of Aptandraceae from Honduras. Annals of the Missouri Botanical Garden 97: 457–467. Correction (2011)

Nickrent, D. L. 1987. Systematics and population biology of two sibling species of Arceuthobium (dwarf mistletoes, Viscaceae). Pp. 597-611 In: Proceedings of the 4th. International Symposium on Parasitic Flowering Plants, Phillipps University, Marburg, West Germany, August 2–7, 1987. Eds. H. C. Weber, W. Forstreuter.
Nickrent, D. L. 1986. Genetic polymorphism in the morphologically reduced dwarf mistletoes (Arceuthobium, Viscaceae): an electrophoretic study. American Journal of Botany 73:1492–1502.
Nickrent, D. L., S. I. Guttman, and W. H. Eshbaugh. 1984. Biosystematic and evolutionary relationships among selected taxa of Arceuthobium. pp. 20–35 In: Proceedings of the Symposium on the Biology of Dwarf Mistletoes, Aug. 8, 1984, Technical Coordinators F. Hawksworth and R. Scharpf.

References

External links 
 Publications by Daniel L. Nickrent – Department of Plant Biology, Southern Illinois University Carbondale, IL

American taxonomists
1956 births
21st-century American botanists
20th-century American botanists
Living people